Paul Wallace may refer to:

 Paul Wallace (rugby union) (born 1971), Irish former international rugby union player
 Paul A. W. Wallace (1891–1967), Canadian historian and anthropologist
 Paul Wallace (racing driver) (born 1958), British former racing driver
 Paul Wallace (basketball) (1925–1998), American basketball player
 Paul Wallace (Irish cricketer) (born 1962), Irish cricketer
 Paul Wallace (South African cricketer) (born 1957), South African cricketer
 Paul Wallace (swimmer), American swimmer